Francesca Corbett (born June 3, 2005) is an American badminton player from Foster City, California.

Career 
Corbett has been competing in badminton since she was six. She is ranked as USA U19 number 5 in girls' singles and number 1 in girls' doubles with her partner Allison Lee. She won the girls' singles and doubles gold medals at the U11 Pan Am Junior Championships in 2015, U13 Pan Am Junior Championships in 2017, and U15 Pan Am Junior Championships in 2019.

In late 2019, she qualified to represent the USA in February 2020 for the Pan Am Male & Female Cup in Salvador, Bahia, Brazil, by winning her first adult national title in the women's doubles. Team USA took second place with Corbett besting one of Brazil's women's singles players.  USA Badminton reported on a tournament in late 2019 concerning Corbett and Lee on winning a national adult tournament: "With this victory, the young duo became the youngest pair to ever be crowned National Adult Champions in USA Badminton history."

In late June 2021, Corbett competed in the USA Badminton Junior National Championships. She won gold in girls' doubles with Lee (U19), gold in the mixed doubles with her partner Samuel Li (U17), and bronze in girls' singles (U19). Corbett also qualified to represent Team USA in the XXIX Pan Am Junior Championships in Acapulco, Mexico, beginning July 15, 2021.

On the final day of the XXIX Pan Am Junior Championships 2021 in Acapulco, Mexico, Team USA had a 3-0 win in the finals against Brazil to take first place in the team event. Corbett and Lee were selected as the women’s doubles entrant for the team event, and went 3-0. Corbett teamed with Bhaavya Manikonda to go a perfect 4-0 in the tournament to help lead Team USA to the team gold medal. Corbett and Lee won First Place Gold in Women's Doubles U19 at the XXIX Pan Am Junior Championships on July 23.  Corbett and partner Samuel Li also picked up Bronze in Mixed Doubles earlier in the week.

Achievements

Pan Am Championships 
Women's doubles

Pan Am Junior Championships 
Girls' doubles

BWF International Challenge/Series (1 title) 
Women's doubles

  BWF International Challenge tournament
  BWF International Series tournament
  BWF Future Series tournament

References 

2005 births
Living people
American female badminton players
People from Foster City, California
21st-century American women